Bogdan Voicu (born December 16, 1981, in Cluj-Napoca) is a former Romanian rugby union football player and coach. He played as a wing.

Club career
During his career, Voicu played for Universitatea Cluj (on three occasions), Timișoara, CUS Perugia, Rugby Modena (both in Italy) and Dinamo București.

International career
Voicu gathered 9 caps for Romania, from his debut in 2003 to his last game in 2005. He scored 1 try during his international career, 5 points on aggregate. He was a member of his national side for the 6th  Rugby World Cup in 2003.

Honours
Dinamo București
 SuperLiga: 2007

References

External links
 
 
 

1981 births
Living people
Romanian rugby union players
Romanian rugby union coaches
Romania international rugby union players
Rugby union wings
CS Universitatea Cluj-Napoca (rugby union) players
SCM Rugby Timișoara players
CS Dinamo București (rugby union) players
Sportspeople from Cluj-Napoca
Expatriate rugby union players in Italy